Spinipterus acsi is a species of driftwood catfish known only from the Amazon River basin in Peru.

References
 

Auchenipteridae

Fish of South America
Fish of Peru
Taxa named by Alberto Akama
Taxa named by Carl J. Ferraris Jr.
Fish described in 2011